Daniel J. Cohen is an American historian. As of 1 June 2017 he is serving as dean of libraries and vice provost for information collaboration at Northeastern University.  He was the Founding Executive Director of the Digital Public Library of America (DPLA). He was the director of the Roy Rosenzweig Center for History and New Media for 12 years, until leaving his position for the DPLA in 2013. His research work has focused around digital history and abstract mathematics being used in Victorian society to explain spirituality. In 2012 he was named one of the Chronicle for Higher Educations Tech Innovators.

He was raised in the Boston area. As a teenager he was named one of the 20 best high school students in New England. He participated in the International Math Olympiad in 1985. Cohen earned his bachelor's degree in religion from Princeton University, his master's degree in the history of religion in the Modern West from Harvard University, and his doctorate in history from Yale University. He studied math while he was at Princeton. He started working for Roy Rosenzweig in 2001. He is a contributing writer to The Atlantic and Wired.

Bibliography

Cohen, Daniel J. and Roy Rosenzweig. "Digital History: A Guide to Gathering, Preserving, and Presenting the Past on the Web". Philadelphia: University of Pennsylvania Press (2005). 
Cohen, Daniel J. Equations from God: Pure Mathematics and Victorian Faith. Baltimore: Johns Hopkins University Press (2007).

References

External links
Official website

Living people
21st-century American historians
21st-century American male writers
Writers from Boston
Yale Graduate School of Arts and Sciences alumni
Harvard Graduate School of Arts and Sciences alumni
Princeton University alumni
George Mason University faculty
Harvard University staff
Historians from Massachusetts
Year of birth missing (living people)
American male non-fiction writers